Adunni Ade  is an Nigerian actress and model. She was born on the 7th of June in Queens, New York to a German American mother and a Nigerian father from Lagos.

Early life and education 
Adunni Ade was born in Queens, New York to a German-Irish mother and a Yoruba Nigerian father.

She is a Nollywood actress and fashion model. She returned to Nigeria when she was a year and half old with her parents to attend her grandfather's burial. She was brought up in Lagos State, Nigeria till she was in her late teens and moved back  to the United States for her university education.

She attended the Chrisland primary school, Opebi, Lagos State, where she obtained her First School Leaving Certificate. She obtained her Senior School Certificate Examination (SSCE) at the Bells Comprehensive Secondary School, Ota, Ogun State.

Her Lagos-based father, who is also a successful businessman inspired her to study accounting. Adunni Ade studied accounting at the University of Kentucky . Prior to her return to Nigeria, Adunni Ade worked with the State of Kentucky in the Housing sector providing living assistance, and also the State of Maryland in the Medical Insurance department providing medical insurance (Medicare and Medicaid) to those in need.

Career 
Adunni Ade worked in the housing and insurance sectors in the United States before switching to the entertainment industry. Adunni ventured into fashion modeling and was featured in America's Next Top Model. After moving back to Nigeria, she landed her first Nollywood role when she acted in the Yoruba language film "You or I" in 2013.

Her short video comedy skit "Date Gone Bad", which was released on YouTube in 2014, recorded more than 170,000 hits.

She has also featured in several other Nollywood movies in both English and Yoruba languages, including some music videos for Sound Sultan and Ice Prince.
In 2021 Adunni Ade ventured into Film production with her Film production company Lou-Ellen Clara Company Limited and debuted her first film as an executive producer SOÓLÈ featuring top actors in the country such as Sola Sobowale, Femi Jacobs, Meg Otanwa, Shawn Faqua, Lateef Dimeji. The movie was Directed by Kayode Kasum. Soólè hit the cinemas November 26, 2021 and grossed 10.2million naira in its opening weekend and 16 million naira in its opening week. After 9 weeks in the cinemas, soólè hit 51 million naira in the box office making it top 10 Nollywood movies in cinemas for 2021.

She also received her first Yoruba Award for Best Yoruba Actress for the 5th Edition of Cool Wealth awards.

She received a Stella Award from the Nigerian Institute of Journalism for her efforts in promoting the Nigerian culture.

In 2017, Adunni Ade became the brand ambassador for OUD Majestic.

In 2018, she wrote and produced her first Yoruba movie titled: "Emi Mi – My Soul", directed by Saheed Balogun. The movie starred Ibrahim Chatta, D'Marion Young, Sunkanmi Omobolanle, and Sola Kosoko .

Later that year, she produced another Yoruba drama movie titled: "Ewa – Beauty", directed by Saheed Balogun and featured Ibrahim Chatta, Yinka Quadri, Kunle Omisore, and Tayo Sobola. She has been featured in well over 100 movies in Nigeria (both in the English and Yoruba aspect of Nollywood).

Personal life 
Ade is a single mother of two boys Ayden Young and D’marion Young.

Selected filmography

Film 
 Soole 2021 - Executive Producer
 The Vendor 2018
 Ole Ole 2019
 Ratnik 2020
 Mama Drama 2020
 The New Normal 2020
Iwo tabi emi (You or I)  (2013)
What's Within (2014)
2nd Honeymoon (2014)
Head Gone (2015)
So in Love (2015)
Schemers (2016)
Diary of a Lagos Girl (2016)
For The Wrong Reasons (2016)
It's Her Day (2016) Earned her the nomination for Best Supporting Actress in Africa's biggest Movie Awards, AMVCA in 2017.  She also won Best Supporting Actress Award at the Lagos Film Festival for the movie.
The Blogger's Wife (2017)
Guy n Man (2017)
Boss of All Bosses (2018)
The Vendor (2018)
 Falz Experience (2018)
 Guyman (2018)
 Heaven on my mind (2018)
House Of Contention (2019)
Coincidence (2020)
Ratnik (2020)
 Mama Drama (2020)
 The New Normal (2020)
 The Silent Baron

Television 
Behind the Cloud
Babatunde Diaries
Jenifa's Diary Season 2
Sons of the caliphate Season 2

See also 
List of Yoruba people

References

External links 

Nigerian film actresses
Living people
People from Queens, New York
American people of Nigerian descent
American people of Yoruba descent
American emigrants to Nigeria
Actresses in Yoruba cinema
21st-century Nigerian actresses
Nigerian television actresses
Yoruba actresses
Nigerian people of German descent
American people of German descent
University of Kentucky alumni
1976 births
Actresses from Lagos
America's Next Top Model contestants
Yoruba female models
Models from New York City
Nigerian female models
Nigerian film award winners
Nigerian media personalities